The 1936 Roller Hockey World Cup was the first world cup tournament in the history of roller sports. Organized by the Fédération Internationale de Patinage a Roulettes (now under the name of Fédération Internationale de Roller Sports), it was a roller hockey tournament contested by 7 national teams (all from Europe) and it is also considered the 1936 European Roller Hockey Championship. All the games were played in the city of Stuttgart, in southern Germany, the chosen city to host the World Cup.

Results

Standings

See also
FIRS Roller Hockey World Cup
CERH European Roller Hockey Championship

External links
1936 World Cup in rink-hockey.net historical database

Roller Hockey World Cup
1936 in roller hockey
1936 in German sport
International roller hockey competitions hosted by Germany